The 1996 West Virginia Mountaineers football team represented West Virginia University in the 1996 NCAA Division I-A football season. It was the Mountaineers' 104th overall and 6th season as a member of the Big East Conference (Big East). The team was led by head coach Don Nehlen, in his 17th year, and played their home games at Mountaineer Field in Morgantown, West Virginia. They finished the season with a record of eight wins and four losses (8–4 overall, 4–3 in the Big East) and with a loss in the Gator Bowl against North Carolina.

Schedule

Roster

References

West Virginia
West Virginia Mountaineers football seasons
West Virginia Mountaineers football